Phanoptis is a genus of moths of the family Notodontidae. It consists of the following species:
Phanoptis cyanomelas  C. and R. Felder, 1874
Phanoptis donahuei  Miller, 2008
Phanoptis fatidica  (Dognin, 1910) 
Phanoptis miltorrhabda  Prout, 1922
Phanoptis taxila  Druce, 1907
Phanoptis vitrina  Druce, 1886

Notodontidae of South America